Mark Philipp Joachim (born 10 May 1973) is a German former professional tennis player.

Born in Munich, Joachim had a best singles world ranking of 266 on the professional tour, where he made qualifying draw appearances at the Australian Open and Wimbledon. He featured in his only ATP Tour main draw at the Austrian Open Kitzbühel in 1991, reaching the second round of the doubles.

ITF Futures finals

Singles: 2 (0–2)

Doubles: 1 (0–1)

References

External links
 
 

1973 births
Living people
German male tennis players
Tennis players from Munich
20th-century German people
21st-century German people